Richard Joseph Seigler is the current defensive line assistant coach of the Portland State Vikings college football team and former NCAA All-American and NFL Linebacker.  He was drafted out of Oregon State University in 2004 by the San Francisco 49ers. In November 2005, he was acquired by the Pittsburgh Steelers, playing with them during their Super Bowl XL winning season. He finished up his playing years with the Toronto Argonauts of the CFL before moving on to his coaching career. Seigler played under the tutelage of National Championship Head Coach Dennis Erickson and Mike Riley in the college ranks. In the NFL, he played under Super Bowl Championship coaches Mike Tomlin and Bill Cowher.

Early years
Seigler was born and raised in Las Vegas and attended Chaparral High School. Seigler was the oldest of 9 children, having 5 brothers and 3 sisters. Seigler was selected First-team All-Sunrise Conference as a Linebacker and Wide receiver as a senior. Seigler was also a basketball player, and was selected All-Conference at Forward while leading his team in scoring and rebounding. Commenting on Seigler's natural leadership ability and selection as an OSU Team Captain, Brooks Hatch of the Corvallis Gazette-Times wrote, "It's a rare honor for an underclassman. In the past 30-odd years only 4 other non-senior Beavers have earned that distinction."

Career highlights and awards
 2010:
 Pac-10 All-Decade Team
 Oregon State All-Decade Team
 2009:
 Selected #7 Best Player of the 2000s for Oregon State
 2006:
Super Bowl XL Champion
 2004:
Invited to play in 79th Annual East-West Shrine Game
 2003:
 Oregon State Beavers Co-MVP (along with Dwan Edwards and Steven Jackson)
 1st Team Defense All-Star LB (Pac-10)
 Surpassed All-American Inoke Breckterfield to become OSU's All-Time Defensive Point Record Holder with 1,344
 Bronko Nagurski Trophy Watch List
 Rotary Lombardi Award Watch List
 Las Vegas Bowl Champion
 OSU Football Team Captain
 2002:
 1st Team Defense All-Star LB (Pac-10)
 Butkus Award Watch List
 OSU Football Team Captain
 2001:
 Fiesta Bowl Champion (Only Freshman starter on Championship Team)
2nd Team All-Star LB (Pac-10)
 2000:
 Freshman All-American LB
 Oregon State University "Male Newcomer of the Year" Award
 1998:
 High School All-Conference Defensive MVP Award
 1st Team All-Star Linebacker and Wide receiver (Sunrise 4A Region - Las Vegas)

College career statistics
 356 tackles (#4 Best Mark Ever at Oregon State)
 53 Tackles-For-Loss Career (7 TFL in a single game against Arizona State October 20, 2001. #1 on Oregon State All-Time List)
 7 sacks
 4 recovered fumbles
 17 pass breakups
 9 interceptions (1 INT returned for 65-yard Touchdown)
 49 Consecutive Starts (2nd All-Time at Oregon State)

2007 investigation
Although the case was dismissed and Seigler was innocent, in May 2007, a Las Vegas news affiliate learned that Seigler was under investigation in connection to a prostitution ring operating in the city. He was released from the Pittsburgh Steelers. Seigler surrendered himself to Pittsburgh police and U.S. Marshals and was accused of pandering and providing transportation for a prostitute. All charges were dismissed in March 2008, and he expressed a desire to play in the NFL again. The Steelers did not reacquire Seigler after all charges were dropped. Seigler then ventured to play in the CFL for the Toronto Argonauts and work his way back into the NFL. In 2010 Nigel Burton, Head Coach of the Portland State Vikings, offered Seigler a spot on the coaching staff. Burton told the Portland Tribune, "It's unfortunate his name got dragged through the mud. I believe in second chances, but to be honest, this isn't even a second chance for the guy. He is working hard. You can't kick him out of the office. He wants to be a great coach. He and I are a lot alike in that regard. We love a challenge. You question me and my character, I'll show you. You question my ability to coach, I'll show you. That's how he is. That's why I love him, and I'm glad he is here."

References

External links
Vikings Football Coach Profile
Vikings Give Seigler a Shot
Dee Andros taught Beavers importance of the rivalry
Steelers reserve Kemoe'atu is "just happy to be here"
Steelers Visit WWE SmackDown
Oregon State Football Team Accolades
They Always Have Answers
Toronto Argonauts profile page
Chaparral product Seigler starting strong with 49ers
Bronko Nagurski Watch List 2003-2004
Steelers Motivate Troops Overseas from Super Bowl XL Media Day
Duty Calls For This Blue Collar Beaver
95.5 The Game Radio Interview

1980 births
Living people
American football linebackers
Oregon State Beavers football players
Pittsburgh Steelers players
Portland State Vikings football coaches
San Francisco 49ers players
Sportspeople from the Las Vegas Valley
Toronto Argonauts players